Yellow pine is a number of conifer species which yield similar strong wood.

Yellow pine may also refer to:

Plants 
 Pinus palustris, longleaf pine
 Pinus echinata, shortleaf pine
 Pinus elliottii, slash pine
 Pinus jeffreyi, Jeffrey pine
 Pinus ponderosa, ponderosa pine
 Pinus taeda, loblolly pine
 Pinus strobus, eastern white pine
 Pinus sylvestris, Scots pine
 Halocarpus biformis, yellow pine or pink pine, a tree endemic to New Zealand

Places 
 Yellow Pine, Alabama
 Yellow Pine, Idaho
 Yellow Pine, Louisiana

See also 
 Bull pine
 List of Pinus species